Hartz Point, Nova Scotia  is a  community in Shelburne County, Nova Scotia, Canada.

References

General Service Areas in Nova Scotia
Communities in Shelburne County, Nova Scotia